Marbles is the 13th studio album from rock band Marillion, released in 2004. Unlike their previous studio album, Anoraknophobia (2001), which was financed largely by a preorder campaign, the band funded the recording, and it was the publicity campaign that fans financed for the album. Those fans who pre-ordered the album received an exclusive 2-CD "Deluxe Campaign Edition" with a booklet containing the names of everyone who pre-ordered before a certain date. The public release date of the retail single-CD version of the album was 3 May 2004 while a plain 2-CD version was made available from the band's website. A limited (500 copy) edition was released on white multicoloured vinyl by Racket Records on 13 November 2006.

In 2017, the 2-CD version became available as a  retail edition by the Madfish label, who also released the full album on vinyl for the first time, occupying three LPs.

The album did not chart in the UK, due to it being packaged with a couple of stickers, which is against chart rules.  So despite selling enough for a top 30 position, the album was declared ineligible for the album chart; however, its first single "You're Gone", reached #7 in the UK Singles Chart, thus becoming their first UK top ten hit since 1987's "Incommunicado". The follow-up single "Don't Hurt Yourself" peaked at #16. Classic Rock ranked Marbles #11 on their end-of-year list for 2004.

Concept and reception 

Marbles was the second Marillion album in a row produced by Dave Meegan, who had already helped the band craft Brave and Afraid of Sunlight, albums to which Marbles was compared by both reviewers as well as the band itself. Unlike Anoraknophobia though, Marbles was mostly not mixed by Meegan but Mike Hunter. Exceptions are "The Invisible Man", "Fantastic Place", "Ocean Cloud", "You're Gone" (mixed by Meegan) and "Genie" (mixed by Steven Wilson) and "Angelina" (mixed by Meegan and Wilson).

While Marbles is not strictly a concept album, it is tied together by thematic threads. Several of the songs are connected via segues or crossfades. The four parts of the title track work as musical interludes, but they also tell a continuing story about the narrator's childhood fascination with marbles, collecting them and losing most of them over the years. ("Losing one's marbles" is slang term for going insane, which has also been described as a theme of "The Invisible Man".) Furthermore, the song "The Damage" includes multiple lyrical call-backs to "Genie"; "Ocean Cloud" mentions "the invisible man" and in a key moment of "Neverland", the line "you're gone" appears.

According to Steve Hogarth, escape is a recurring theme on the album.

"Ocean Cloud" is inspired by and dedicated to Don Allum and the Ocean Rowers, even including a link to Allum's at-sea diary and actual samples of him talking about the experience.

Track listing 
All songs written by Steve Hogarth, Steve Rothery, Mark Kelly, Pete Trewavas, Ian Mosley.

Disc one

 "The Invisible Man" – 13:37
 "Marbles I" – 1:42
 "Genie" – 4:54
 "Fantastic Place" – 6:12
 "The Only Unforgivable Thing" – 7:13
 "Marbles II" – 2:02
 "Ocean Cloud" – 17:58

Disc two

 "Marbles III" – 1:51
 "The Damage" – 4:35
 "Don't Hurt Yourself" – 5:48
 "You're Gone" – 6:25
 "Angelina" – 7:42
 "Drilling Holes" – 5:11
 "Marbles IV" – 1:26
 "Neverland" – 12:10

Note: The single CD and double vinyl editions of the album omit the following tracks:

"Genie"
"The Only Unforgiveable Thing"
"Ocean Cloud"
"The Damage"

Personnel 
 Steve Hogarth – vocals
 Mark Kelly – keyboards
 Ian Mosley – drums
 Steve Rothery – guitar
 Pete Trewavas – bass guitar

Charts

References

External links 
 Album information

Marillion albums
2004 albums
Albums produced by Dave Meegan